Robert F. Fuchs was the 38th President of the American Orchid Society. An accredited American Orchid Society judge.

Honors 
Life Member American Orchid Society

Florida Horticultural Hall of Fame

Co-chairman and President of the 19th World Orchid Conference

References 

Living people
Year of birth missing (living people)
American horticulturists